Airjack may refer to:
 Aircraft hijacking
 Airjack (device driver)